Town School for Boys, located in San Francisco, California, is an independent day school for boys from kindergarten through the eighth grade.

The school was established in 1939 by parents from the recently closed and privately owned Damon School, and in 1938–39 was known as the Tamalpais Junior School. Town School for Boys is considered a college preparatory institution for boys in San Francisco. The school is well respected nationally, and has a thriving teacher training program called the New Teacher Institute, founded in 1990. The enrollment of over 400 boys is divided into 9 grades, K - 8, with two classes per grade.

While renovations took place in the 2013–14 school year, the school temporarily leased the space in the Palace of Fine Arts vacated by the Exploratorium.

Governance
Town, like most independent schools, is governed by a Board of Trustees composed of parents, alumni, and other stakeholders.

Heads of School 

 1938–1957, Edwin M. Rich
 1957- 1962, Robert M. Kimball
 1962–1963, Dr. Harold E. Merrick
 1963–1965, Samuel Hazard
 1965–1967, Marshall Umpleby
 1967–1989, David L. Pratt
 1989–2016, W. Brewster Ely
 2016–2017, Lila B. Lohr, Interim
 2017–present, Lorri Hamilton Durbin

Notable alumni
Nick Traina
John Heinz
Ethan Canin
Mark Pirie
Deke Sharon
Alex Gansa
Ulrich Schmid-Maybach

References

External links
 

Education in San Francisco
Private K–8 schools in California